Lonesome Lake Peak, also known as Lonesome Peak, at  above sea level is a peak in the White Cloud Mountains of Idaho. The peak is located in Sawtooth National Recreation Area in Custer County. It is the 68th highest peak in Idaho and rises above the west side of Lonesome Lake, the uppermost of the Boulder Chain Lakes.

References 

Mountains of Custer County, Idaho
Mountains of Idaho
Glacial lakes of the Sawtooth National Forest